In mathematics, specifically differential calculus, the inverse function theorem gives a sufficient condition for a function to be invertible in a neighborhood of a point in its domain: namely, that its derivative is continuous and non-zero at the point. The theorem also gives a formula for the derivative of the inverse function.
In multivariable calculus, this theorem can be generalized to any continuously differentiable, vector-valued function whose Jacobian determinant is nonzero at a point in its domain, giving a formula for the Jacobian matrix of the inverse. There are also versions of the inverse function theorem for complex holomorphic functions, for differentiable maps between manifolds, for differentiable functions between Banach spaces, and so forth.

The theorem was first established by Picard and Goursat using an iterative scheme: the basic idea is to prove a fixed point theorem using the contraction mapping theorem.

Statements

It can happen that a function  may be injective near a point  while . (The situation is different for holomorphic functions; see #Holomorphic inverse function theorem below.)

Note that the theorem does not say  is bijective onto the image where  is invertible but that it is locally bijective where  is invertible.

In other words, if  are the Jacobian matrices representing , this means:

(Indeed) Since taking the inverse is infinitely differentiable, the formula for the derivative of the inverse shows that if  is continuously  times differentiable, with invertible derivative at the point , then the inverse is also continuously  times differentiable.

There are two variants of the inverse function theorem. Given a continuously differentiable map , the first is
The derivative  is surjective (i.e., the Jacobian matrix representing it has rank ) if and only if there exists a continuously differentiable function  on a neighborhood  of  such  near ,
and the second is
The derivative  is injective if and only if there exists a continuously differentiable function  on a neighborhood  of  such  near .

In the first case (when  is surjective), the point  is called a regular value. The statement in the first case is a special case of the submersion theorem.

These variants are restatements of the inverse functions theorem. Indeed, in the first case when  is surjective, we can find an (injective) linear map  such that . Define  so that we have:

Thus, by the inverse function theorem,  has inverse near ; i.e.,  near . The second case ( is injective) is seen in the similar way.

Example
Consider the vector-valued function  defined by:

The Jacobian matrix is:

with Jacobian determinant:

The determinant  is nonzero everywhere. This does not mean  is invertible over its entire domain: in this case  is not even injective since it is periodic: .

Counter-example 

If one drops the assumption that the derivative is continuous, the function no longer need be invertible. For example  and  has discontinuous derivative
Intuitively, the slope  does not propagate to nearby points, where the slopes are governed by a weak but rapid oscillation.

Methods of proof
As an important result, the inverse function theorem has been given numerous proofs. The proof most commonly seen in textbooks relies on the contraction mapping principle, also known as the Banach fixed-point theorem (which can also be used as the key step in the proof of existence and uniqueness of solutions to ordinary differential equations).

Since the fixed point theorem applies in infinite-dimensional (Banach space) settings, this proof generalizes immediately to the infinite-dimensional version of the inverse function theorem (see Generalizations below).

An alternate proof in finite dimensions hinges on the extreme value theorem for functions on a compact set.

Yet another proof uses Newton's method, which has the advantage of providing an effective version of the theorem: bounds on the derivative of the function imply an estimate of the size of the neighborhood on which the function is invertible.

A proof using successive approximation 

By the fundamental theorem of calculus if  is a C1 function, so that . Setting , it follows that

The assumptions show that if  then

.

In particular  implies . In the inductive scheme 
By construction  as required.

To check that  is C1, write  so that
. By the inequalities above,  so that .
On the other hand if , then . But then

The proof above is presented for a finite-dimensional space, but applies equally well for Banach spaces. This follows by induction using the fact that the map  on operators is Ck for any  (in the finite-dimensional case this is an elementary fact because the inverse of a matrix is given as the adjugate matrix divided by its determinant).
 The method of proof here can be found in the books of Henri Cartan, Jean Dieudonné, Serge Lang, Roger Godement and Lars Hörmander.

A proof using the contraction mapping principle 
Here is a proof based on the contraction mapping theorem. Specifically, following T. Tao, it uses the following consequence of the contraction mapping theorem.

Basically, the lemma says that a small perturbation of the identity map by a contraction map is injective and preserves a ball in some sense. Assuming the lemma for a moment, we prove the theorem first. Let . The mean value inequality applied to  says:

Then

is bijective and thus has an inverse. Next, we show the inverse  is continuously differentiable (this part of the argument is the same as that in the previous proof). Now, by the early estimate, we have

and so . Writing  for the operator norm,

Also,  is the same as the composition  where ; so  is continuous.

It remains to show the lemma. First, the map  is injective on  since if , then  and so
,
which is a contradiction unless . (This part does not need the assumption .) Next we show .

where  such that  and the bar means a closed ball. To find a fixed point, we use the contraction mapping theorem and checking that  is a well-defined strict-contraction mapping is straightforward. Finally, we have:  since

As might be clear, this proof is not substantially different from the previous one, as the proof of the contraction mapping theorem is by successive approximation.

Applications

Implicit function theorem
The inverse function theorem can be used to solve a system of equations

The implicit function theorem allows to solve a more general system of equations:

Though more general, the theorem is actually a consequence of the inverse function theorem. First, the precise statement of the implicit function theorem is as follows:
Moreover, if , then ; i.e.,  is a unique solution.
To see this, consider the map . By the inverse function theorem,  has the inverse  for some neighborhoods . We then have:

implying  and  Thus  has the required property.

Giving a manifold structure
In differential geometry, the inverse function theorem is used to show that the pre-image of a regular value under a smooth map is a manifold. Then the map  is such that  has rank . We then have

which implies

Moreover, since  is bijective, the map

is bijective with the smooth inverse. Hence,  is a manifold. (Note the proof is quite similar to the proof of the implicit function theorem and, in fact, the implicit function theorem can be also used instead.)

More generally, the theorem shows that if a smooth map  is transversal to a submanifold , then the pre-image  is a submanifold.

Global version 
The inverse function theorem is a local result; it applies to each point. A priori, the theorem thus only shows the function  is locally bijective (or locally diffeomorphic of some class). The next topological lemma can be used to upgrade local injectivity to injectivity that is global to some extent.

Proof: First assume  is compact. Now, if  is large enough,  are in a neighborhood of  where  is injective; thus, a contradiction.

In general, consider the set . Then, by the first part of the proof, for each , we can find a neighborhood  of  such that . Then  has the required property. (See also  for an alternative approach.)

The lemma implies the following (a sort of) global version of the inverse function theorem:

Note that if  is a point, then the above is the usual inverse function theorem.

Holomorphic inverse function theorem 
There is a version of the inverse function theorem for holomorphic maps.

The theorem follows from the usual inverse function theorem. Then we have , which is nonzero by assumption. Hence, by the usual inverse function theorem,  is injective near  with continuously differentiable inverse.

Thus,  for each . 

Similarly, there is the implicit function theorem for holomorphic functions.

As already noted earlier, it can happen that an injective smooth function has the inverse that is not smooth (e.g.,  in a real variable). This is not the case for holomorphic functions because of:

Formulations for manifolds 
The inverse function theorem can be rephrased in terms of differentiable maps between differentiable manifolds.

is a linear isomorphism at a point  in  then there exists an open neighborhood  of  such that

is a diffeomorphism.

Generalizations

Banach spaces
Moreover,  is the only sufficiently small solution  of the equation .

There is also the inverse function theorem for Banach manifolds.

Constant rank theorem
The inverse function theorem (and the implicit function theorem) can be seen as a special case of the constant rank theorem, which states that a smooth map with constant rank near a point can be put in a particular normal form near that point. That is,  "looks like" its derivative near . Thus the constant rank theorem applies to a generic point of the domain.

Polynomial functions
If it is true, the Jacobian conjecture would be a variant of the inverse function theorem for polynomials. It states that if a vector-valued polynomial function has a Jacobian determinant that is an invertible polynomial (that is a nonzero constant), then it has an inverse that is also a polynomial function. It is unknown whether this is true or false, even in the case of two variables. This is a major open problem in the theory of polynomials.

Selections

See also
Nash–Moser theorem

Notes

References

 
 
 
.
 
 
 
 

Multivariable calculus
Differential topology
Inverse functions
Theorems in real analysis
Theorems in calculus

de:Satz von der impliziten Funktion#Satz von der Umkehrabbildung